Novi Bečej is a town and municipality located in the Central Banat District of the autonomous province of Vojvodina, Serbia. The town has a population of 13,133, while Novi Bečej municipality has 23,925 inhabitants.

Name 

Novi Bečej means "New Bečej". In the past it was known as Turski Bečej ("Turkish Bečej"), while the current town of Bečej, across the river Tisa (in the Bačka region) was in the past known as Stari Bečej (Serbian Cyrillic: , "Old Bečej").

There are several theories about town's name origin. The first one is that it derives from Castellum de Beche, which was the name of the fort located near today's town center. The other theory is that the name was given after the family Wechey, which used rule the settlement and the land around modern-day Novi Bečej. The town was also known as Turski Bečej (Турски Бечеј). In 1919 it was renamed Novi Bečej (Нови Бечеј).

For a short period of time after the World War II, from 1947 to 1952, the name of the town was Волошиново (Vološinovo) after the Red Army Colonel Lavrenty Voloshinov who died in the battle for the liberation of the town.

In Serbian, the town is known as Novi Bečej (Нови Бечеј), in Hungarian as Törökbecse and in German as Neu-Betsche. Both Serbian and Hungarian are officially used by municipal authorities.

History 

12th century BC ornithomorphic pendants were found in the town. The Dacians inhabited the region before the Roman conquest in the second to first century BC.

The town was first mentioned in 1091 during the administration of the Kingdom of Hungary. In the 15th century, it was a possession of the Serbian despot Đurađ Branković. During the Ottoman rule (in 1660/6), it was populated by ethnic Serbs. Ottomans administered the town as Beçe from 1552 to 1718. Until 1918, it was part of the Habsburg monarchy, then part of the Kingdom of Serbs, Croats and Slovenes and subsequent South Slavic states.

Inhabited places 

Novi Bečej municipality includes the town of Novi Bečej and the following villages:

Bočar 
Kumane 
Novo Miloševo

Demographics 

According to the 2011 census, the total population of the municipality of Novi Bečej was 23,925 inhabitants.

Ethnic groups 

Municipality

According to the 2011 census, the Novi Bečej municipality has 23,925 inhabitants, including:

16,132 Serbs (67.43%)
4,319 Hungarians (18.05%)
1,295 Romani (5.41%)
2,179 Others and undeclared (9.11%)

All settlements in the municipality have an ethnic Serb majority.

Town

The town of Novi Bečej had 13,133 inhabitants, including:

7,738 Serbs (58.92%)
3,210 Hungarians (24.44%)
609 Romani (4.64%)
Others and undeclared Yugoslavs (12.00%)

Economy 

There are several factories operating in Novi Bečej, but the leading branch of economic development is tourism. The town is located on the river Tisa, and thus it offers many leisure opportunities. One of the most notable large companies are IGK Polet (ceramics industry, member of Nexe group), PD Vojvodina (agricultural combine, member of MK Group) and Serbia Manufacture (shoes industry).

The following table gives a preview of total number of employed people per their core activity (as of 2016):

Culture 

Serbia's fourth largest festival, Velikogospojinski Dani ("Dormition Days"), is held in Novi Bečej. The festival honors the town's patron saint, Mary. It gathers more than 200,000 visitors from across Serbia and surrounding areas. Most popular Serbian, Croatian, and Hungarian singers and bands, such as Lepa Brena, Zdravko Čolić, Severina, Tony Cetinski, Crvena Jabuka, Plavi Orkestar, Željko Joksimović, Edda, Omega, etc. have performed here. Also, great historical legacy is a big boost, since there are remains of a medieval monastery Arača and the old fort.

Arača 

Arača, is a medieval Romanesque church ruin about 12 km north of Novi Bečej. It is the one of the older churches built in the region during administration of the Kingdom of Hungary. The department for the Protection and Scientific Study of Cultural Monuments in Belgrade issued a decision in 1948 which placed the Romanesque church of Arača under state protection.

The church was built around 1230, robbed and devastated in 1280, and reconstructed in 1370 at the command of Queen Elizabeth. The Gothic tower that is still extant today probably dates from this time. In the year 1417 it came into possession of Serbian despot Stefan Lazarević. Later it belonged to the Serbian despot Đurađ Branković who gave it as a present to Pál Birinyi. In the year 1551, the Ottomans burned the cathedral down and it was never reconstructed again. At the end of the 18th century it belonged to Sissány family.

Saint Nicholas Church 

The Serbian Orthodox church dedicated to Saint Nicholas was built in 1774. The belfry was added in 1789, during the Austro-Turkish War of 1788-91. The church was renovated in 1858 and again in 1871, when the bell was enclosed in the new belfry and the cross on the top of it was plated with gold. The church was thoroughly renovated in 1928: icons were rejuvenated, frescoes turned black from the silt and smoke were cleaned, the interior was ornamented with the plated gold and was repainted and decorated, both the exterior and the interior. New floor was built, made from the white-grayish ceramic tiles imported from Czechoslovakia, and the electricity was introduced into the building. The 1928 reconstruction was work of en entire group of artists, artisans and craftsmen, headed by painter Vasa Pomorišac.

The church was renovated again in 1981. Due to the rapid deterioration because of the moist, the Institute for the protection of the cultural monuments drafted a preservation project. The works on the edifice itself were finished by 2018, while the restoration of the icons and other artifacts continued. Artifacts are considered more valuable than the church itself, as they are older. Most of them originated from the older and demolished church dedicated to the Dormition of the Mother of God, which was located on the bank of the Tisza.

Other features 

German Ethnic House 

In 2020, German ethnic house was opened for public in the house of Krisztina Link Majer. The house belongs to the so-called švapska kuća type ("Swabian house"), though a bit affluent one, built before World War II. Affluence, apart from having more rooms and larger yard, also means that it has three steps at the door, as the poorer people built houses directly on the ground. Specific architectural style includes mixed brick-earth walls and steep, two-faced hipped roof which was originally made of straw, but later replaced with roof tiles. The yard is elongated, with numerous auxiliary objects, like pantry, horse stable, cart shed, barn and pigsty. Exhibited artifacts are mostly over 100 years old (horse sleds, hand powered corn husker, special clover rake, preserved animal skulls). Some are much older, like the large circle with several planks which was the roof construction of nomadic yurt, or the fifth century leather armor.

Museum of Serbian Diaspora

In 2020 it was announced that the Pivnički House was purchased by the municipality and will be adapted into the Museum of Serbian Diaspora. The Pivnički family was well established and their house, originally purchased by Dr. Jovan Pivnički, hosted Mihajlo Pupin, Branislav Nušić, Laza Kostić and Vladimir Tolstoy, Leo Tolstoy's grandson. Member of the Pivnički family is Mila Mulroney (née Milica Pivnički), the spouse of the prime minister of Canada Brian Mulroney and granddaughter of Jovan. Born in Sarajevo, she lived in the house as a newborn until 1958, when she was 5 and her family emigrated to Canada.

Nature

Slano Kopovo 

Slano Kopovo is located in the northeast of Novi Bečej and near the river Tisa, in its ancient meander. Though salty, it has a freshwater depression on the eastern side. It is one of the last preserved salt marshes in Serbia. It features unique Pannonian habitats typified by salty, muddy ponds and lakes or their occasionally dry beds. Slano Kopovo is a priceless centre of salt-marsh habitats which is threatened with complete disappearance.

The significance of Slano Kopovo is manifold. It is one of the most important and unique bird habitats in Serbia. It is of particular value in that species are found nesting here which are typical of the Ponto-Caspian and sea coasts and not of the Pannonian Plain. This is also a unique stopover point for migratory bird species. With the Tisa close by, species which follow the course of this river and its forest belt readily alight on this wide, open water surface.

The main attraction are the cranes. They arrive in the late fall, migrating from the Northern Europe and are the largest crane population in the Pannonian Plane. Over 20,000 cranes gather on the lake, with additional thousands of other birds, like mallards and geese. Several marine birds, rarely seen far from the sea, nest in the area: Kentish plover, black-winged stilt, pied avocet. In total, 203 bird species have been recorded at Slano Kopovo, which is 63% of all the known species in Vojvodina. Some 80 species nest in the marsh.

Slano Kopovo has been declared a special natural reserve, Important Bird Area and a Ramsar site.

Gallery

Notable citizens 

Aleksandar Berić, Serbian war hero in the Kingdom of Yugoslavia
Josif Marinković, Serbian composer
Dubravka Nešović, Serbian singer
Slavko Simić, Serbian actor
Joca Savić, actor
Ognjeslav Kostović, inventor
dr Vladimir Glavaš
dr Jene Sentklarai
Draginja Ružić, first Serbian professional actress
Nikanor, episkop Bački, prelate

Twin cities 

 Mezőtúr, Hungary
 Štúrovo, Slovakia
 Bataysk, Russia
 Straža, Slovenia
 Knjaževac, Serbia

See also 
Municipalities of Serbia
Central Banat District
List of places in Serbia
List of cities, towns and villages in Vojvodina

References

Sources 
 Slobodan Ćurčić, Broj stanovnika Vojvodine, Novi Sad, 1996.

External links 

 more about Novi Bečej
 Bečej and Novi Bečej

 
Populated places in Serbian Banat
Populated places in Central Banat District
Municipalities and cities of Vojvodina
Towns in Serbia